Still in Love is the fifth album by Carrie Lucas. Released in 1982 on the SOLAR Records label.

Track listing
"Show Me Where You're Coming From"
"Sweet Love"
"Men"
"Is It a Dream?"
"Rockin' for Your Love"
"Dreamer"
"I Just Can't Do Without Your Love"
"Still in Love"

Album

Singles

References

1982 albums
SOLAR Records albums
Carrie Lucas albums